The following is a list of the Chiefs of Clan Cameron of Lochiel, the senior line of the ancient Cameron family who claim descent from Banquo. The chief is seated at Achnacarry Castle and is uniquely referred to as the Lochiel.

References

Cameron